The Yiftach Brigade (also known as the Yiftah Brigade, the 11th Brigade in the 1948 Arab–Israeli War) was an Israeli infantry brigade. It included two Palmach battalions (the 1st and 7th), and later also the 2nd, which was transferred from the Negev Brigade.

The Palmach memorial website records 274 of its members being killed whilst in the Yiftach Brigade.

Military operations
The Yiftach Brigade participated in the following Israeli military operations:

 Operation Yiftach
 Operation Yoram
 Operation Danny
 Operation Yoav
 Metzudat Koach

Memorial
The memorial for the fallen soldiers of the Yiftach Brigade is situated in the northern Negev north of Rahat, near Kibbutz Beit Kama and Kama Junction on Road 40.

See also
 List of battles and operations in the 1948 Palestine war

1948 Arab–Israeli War
Brigades of Israel